The 1912 Arkansas Razorbacks football team represented the University of Arkansas during the 1912 college football season. In their fifth and final year under head coach Hugo Bezdek, the Razorbacks compiled a 4–6 record and were outscored by all opponents by a combined total of 179 to 149. The Razorbacks were blown out in games against Texas A&M (27–0), Wisconsin (64–7), and Texas (48–0). Bezdek left Arkansas after the 1912 season to become head football coach at Oregon, where he was offered more money and a modern gymnasium and athletic field. He was inducted into the College Football Hall of Fame as a coach in 1954.

Schedule

References

Arkansas
Arkansas Razorbacks football seasons
Arkansas Razorbacks football